Keshel Varzal (also known as Keshel) is a village in Eslamabad Rural District, Sangar District, Rasht County, Gilan Province, Iran. At the 2006 census, its population was 402, in 105 families.

References 

Populated places in Rasht County